Meicheng  may refer to the following towns in China:
梅城：
Meicheng, Anhui in Qianshan County, Anhui
Meicheng, Fujian in Minqing County, Fujian
Meicheng, Hunan in Anhua County, Hunan
Meicheng, Zhejiang in Jiande, Zhejiang
玫城：
Alias of Pingyin County